A number of steamships were named Princess Irene, including -

, North German Lloyd liner
, Canadian Pacific Steamships liner which served as HMS Princess Irene during WWI

Ship names